Melanchólia is the ninth studio album by the Italian pop band Matia Bazar, released in 1985.

Track listing

Personnel 

Matia Bazar

 Antonella Ruggiero – lead vocals
 Aldo Stellita – bass guitar
 Carlo Marrale – background vocals; guitar
 Sergio Cossu – keyboards
 Giancarlo Golzi – drums, percussion

Additional musicians

 Jacopo Jacopetti – saxophones
 Rudy Trevisi – saxophones on "Cose"

Production

 Maurizio Salvadori – producer
 Celso Valli – producer
 Roberto Costa – engineer, mixing

Artwork

 Studio Convertino – design
 Fred Greissing – photography

Charts

References

Citations

External links 

 

1985 albums
Matia Bazar albums
Ariston Records albums
Albums produced by Celso Valli